The following is a list of Detroit Mercy Titans men's basketball head coaches. There have been 22 head coaches of the Titans in their 116-season history.

Detroit Mercy's current head coach is Mike Davis. He was hired as the Titans' head coach in June 2018, replacing Bacari Alexander, who was fired after the 2020–21 season.

References

Detroit Mercy

Detroit Mercy Titans men's basketball coaches